The 2021 Colorado Rockies season was the franchise's 29th in Major League Baseball. It is their 27th season at Coors Field. On April 5, 2021, MLB announced that Coors Field would host the 2021 MLB All-Star Game after it was announced that Truist Park in Atlanta, Georgia would not host it due to MLB's opposition on Georgia's new voting laws. On April 26, Rockies executive vice president/general manager Jeff Bridich resigned. The Rockies announced that executive vice president/chief operationg officer Greg Feasel would serve as the team's president/chief operating officer for the remainder of the season, and that Bill Schmidt would serve as interim general manager.

The Rockies started the season with a 6–33 record on the road, which is the worst start on the road in the live-ball era. They split or lost 16 consecutive road series between September 2020 and July 2021, a new low for a team thought by writers to have had a disadvantage when playing in lower altitude when away from Coors Field since its inception.

Offseason

Roster departures
On October 28, 2020, the Rockies declined the 2021 option on Daniel Murphy's contract, and Drew Butera, Matt Kemp, Chris Owings, Kevin Pillar, and A. J. Ramos declared free agency. On November 20, 2020, Ashton Goudeau and Jesús Tinoco were designated for assignment. On December 2, 2020, the Rockies non-tendered outfielder David Dahl, pitcher Chi Chi Gonzalez, and catcher Tony Wolters. Gonzalez was re-signed to a minor league contract on December 11, 2020. Owings was re-signed to a minor league contract on January 20, 2021. Owings was added to the Rockies' 40–man roster on March 20, 2020. Jairo Díaz was designated for assignment on April 1, 2021 to make room for Jhoulys Chacín ahead of Opening Day.

Free agent signings
The Rockies signed pitcher Dereck Rodríguez to a minor league deal with an invitation to spring training on November 9, 2020. On November 13, 2020, the Rockies signed catcher José Briceño to a minor league deal with an invitation to spring training. Pitcher Brian Gonzalez was also signed to a minor league deal with an invite. Outfielder Connor Joe was signed to a minor league deal with an invite to spring training on November 20, 2020. On February 11, 2021, the Rockies signed infielder Greg Bird to a minor league deal with an invitation to spring training. Infielder C. J. Cron was signed to a minor league deal with an invite to spring training on February 15, 2021. Cron was added to the 40–man roster on March 20, 2021. On April 1, 2021, the Rockies signed Jhoulys Chacín to a major league contract ahead of their first game on Opening Day.

Trades
On November 25, 2020, the Rockies traded pitcher Jeff Hoffman and minor league pitcher Case Williams to the Cincinnati Reds for pitcher Robert Stephenson and minor league outfielder Jameson Hannah. On December 3, 2020, the Rockies traded minor league infielder Christian Koss to the Boston Red Sox for minor league pitcher Yoan Aybar. On February 1, 2021, the Rockies traded infielder Nolan Arenado and cash considerations to the St. Louis Cardinals for pitcher Austin Gomber, minor league infielder Elehuris Montero, minor league infielder Mateo Gil, minor league pitcher Tony Locey, and minor league pitcher Jake Sommers.

Rule 5 Draft
In the 2020 Rule 5 Draft, the Rockies selected pitcher Jordan Sheffield from the Los Angeles Dodgers with the 7th pick. No Rockies players were selected in the major league phase of the draft.

Regular season

Season standings

National League West

National League Wild Card

Record vs. opponents

Game log 

|- style="background:#bfb;"
| 1 || April 1 || Dodgers || 8–5 || Gonzalez (1–0) || Kershaw (0–1) || Bard (1) || 20,570 || 1–0 || W1
|- style="background:#fbb;"
| 2 || April 2 || Dodgers || 6–11 || Bauer (1–0) || Senzatela (0–1) || — || 20,363 || 1–1 || L1
|- style="background:#fbb;"
| 3 || April 3 || Dodgers || 5–6 || Treinen (1–0) || Givens (0–1) || Jansen (1) || 20,688 || 1–2 || L2
|- style="background:#fbb;"
| 4 || April 4 || Dodgers || 2–4 || Urías (1–0) || Gomber (0–1) || Knebel (1) || 20,368 || 1–3 || L3
|- style="background:#fbb;"
| 5 || April 6 || Diamondbacks || 8–10 (13) || Peacock (1–0) || Bowden (0–1) || — || 10,240 || 1–4 || L4
|- style="background:#bfb;"
| 6 || April 7 || Diamondbacks || 8–0 || Senzatela (1–1) || Bumgarner (0–1) || — || 12,894 || 2–4 || W1
|- style="background:#bfb;"
| 7 || April 8 || Diamondbacks || 7–3 || Gray (1–0) || Kelly (0–2) || Bard (2) || 10,836 || 3–4 || W2
|- style="background:#fbb;"
| 8 || April 9 || @ Giants || 1–3 || Cueto (1–0) || Gomber (0–2) || McGee (3) || 7,390 || 3–5 || L1
|- style="background:#fbb;"
| 9 || April 10 || @ Giants || 3–4 || Baragar (2–0) || Bowden (0–2) || — || 6,176 || 3–6 || L2
|- style="background:#fbb;"
| 10 || April 11 || @ Giants || 0–4 || DeSclafani (1–0) || Márquez (0–1) || — || 6,560 || 3–7 || L3
|- style="background:#fbb;"
| 11 || April 13 || @ Dodgers || 0–7 || Bauer (2–0) || Senzatela (1–2) || — || 15,021 || 3–8 || L4
|- style="background:#fbb;"
| 12 || April 14 || @ Dodgers || 2–4 || Knebel (1–0) || Gray (1–1) || Jansen (3) || 15,093 || 3–9 || L5
|- style="background:#fbb;"
| 13 || April 15 || @ Dodgers || 5–7 || Nelson (1–1) || Almonte (0–1) || Price (1) || 15,129 || 3–10 || L6
|- style="background:#bbb;"
| — || April 16 || Mets || colspan=7 | Postponed (Snow, Makeup April 17)
|- style="background:#fbb;"
| 14 || April 17  || Mets || 3–4  || deGrom (1–1) || Bard (0–1) || Díaz (1) || N/A || 3–11 || L7
|- style="background:#bfb;"
| 15 || April 17  || Mets || 7–2  || Márquez (1–1) || Lucchesi (0–1) || — || 13,906 || 4–11 || W1
|- style="background:#fbb;"
| 16 || April 18 || Mets || 1–2 || Stroman (3–0) || Senzatela (1–3) || Díaz (2) || 15,082 || 4–12 || L1
|- style="background:#bfb;"
| 17 || April 20 || Astros || 6–2 || Gray (2–1) || García (0–1) || — || 10,144 || 5–12 || W1
|- style="background:#bfb;"
| 18 || April 21 || Astros || 6–3 || Gomber (1–2) || Urquidy (0–2) || — || 7,120 || 6–12 || W2
|- style="background:#bfb;"
| 19 || April 23 || Phillies || 5–4 || Givens (1–1) || Neris (1–2) || — || 14,025 || 7–12 || W3
|- style="background:#fbb;"
| 20 || April 24 || Phillies || 5–7 || Nola (2–1) || Chacín (0–1) || Neris (3) || 20,214 || 7–13 || L1
|- style="background:#bfb;"
| 21 || April 25 || Phillies || 12–2 || Gray (3–1) || Anderson (0–3) || — || 20,244 || 8–13 || W1
|- style="background:#fbb;" 
| 22 || April 26 || @ Giants || 0–12 || DeSclafani (2–0) || Gomber (1–3) || — || 4,129 || 8–14 || L1
|- style="background:#bfb;" 
| 23 || April 27 || @ Giants || 7–5 (10) || Bard (1–1) || Santos (0–2) || Estévez (1) || 5,595 || 9–14 || W1
|- style="background:#fbb;" 
| 24 || April 28 || @ Giants || 3–7 || Wood (3–0) || Márquez (1–2) || — || 6,163 || 9–15 || L1
|- style="background:#fbb;" 
| 25 || April 29 || @ Diamondbacks || 3–5 || Smith (2–1) || Stephenson (0–1) || Crichton (3) || 6,843 || 9–16 || L2
|- style="background:#fbb;"
| 26 || April 30 || @ Diamondbacks || 2–7 || Bumgarner (3–2) || Gray (3–2) || — || 13,184 || 9–17 || L3
|-

|- style="background:#bfb;"
| 27 || May 1 || @ Diamondbacks || 14–6 || Gomber (2–3) || Gallen (1–1) || — || 15,734 || 10–17 || W1
|- style="background:#fbb;"
| 28 || May 2 || @ Diamondbacks || 4–8 || Devenski (1–0) || Bard (1–2) || — || 11,395 || 10–18 || L1
|- style="background:#bbb;" 
| — || May 3 || Giants ||colspan=7| PPD, RAIN; rescheduled for May 4
|- style="background:#fbb;" 
| 29 || May 4  || Giants || 4–12  || Wisler (1–2) || Márquez (1–3) || — || 10,213 || 10–19 || L2
|- style="background:#bfb;"
| 30 || May 4  || Giants || 8–6  || Bowden (1–2) || Doval (0–1) || — || 10,213 || 11–19 || W1
|- style="background:#bfb;" 
| 31 || May 5 || Giants || 6–5 || Gray (4–2) || Webb (1–3) || Bard (3) || 9,521 || 12–19 || W2
|- style="background:#fbb;" 
| 32 || May 7 || @ Cardinals || 0–5 || Flaherty (6–0) || Gomber (2–4) || — || 13,435 || 12–20 || L1
|- style="background:#fbb;" 
| 33 || May 8 || @ Cardinals || 8–9 || Martínez (3–4) || Gonzalez (1–1) || Reyes (10) || 13,390 || 12–21 || L2
|- style="background:#fbb;" 
| 34 || May 9 || @ Cardinals || 0–2 || Wainwright (2–3) || Márquez (1–4) || Helsley (1) || 13,380 || 12–22 || L3
|- style="background:#bbb;" 
| — || May 10 || Padres ||colspan=7| PPD, RAIN; rescheduled for May 12
|- style="background:#fbb;"
| 35 || May 11 || Padres || 1–8 || Díaz (1–0) || Senzatela (1–4) || — || 8,825 || 12–23 || L4
|- style="background:#fbb;" 
| 36 || May 12  || Padres || 3–5  || Pagán (3–0) || Gray (4–3) || Melancon (12) || N/A || 12–24 || L5
|- style="background:#bfb;" 
| 37 || May 12  || Padres || 3–2  || Almonte (1–1) || Ramirez (0–1) || — || 11,968 || 13–24 || W1
|- style="background:#bfb;" 
| 38 || May 13 || Reds || 13–8 || Gonzalez (2–1) || Castillo (1–5) || — || 13,647 || 14–24 || W2
|- style="background:#bfb;" 
| 39 || May 14 || Reds || 9–6 || Márquez (2–4) || Miley (4–3) || Bard (4) || 20,232 || 15–24 || W3
|- style="background:#fbb;" 
| 40 || May 15 || Reds || 5–6  || Sims (3–1) || Santos (0–1) || Hembree (1) || 20,136 || 15–25 || L1
|- style="background:#fbb;" 
| 41 || May 16 || Reds || 6–7 || Doolittle (3–0) || Givens (1–2) || Antone (2) || 15,541 || 15–26 || L2
|- style="background:#fbb;" 
| 42 || May 17 || @ Padres || 0–7 || Darvish (4–1) || Gray (4–4) || — || 15,250 || 15–27 || L3
|- style="background:#fbb;" 
| 43 || May 18 || @ Padres || 1–2  || Johnson (1–1) || Bard (1–3) || — || 15,250 || 15–28 || L4
|- style="background:#fbb;" 
| 44 || May 19 || @ Padres || 0–3 || Musgrove (4–4) || Gonzalez (2–2) || Melancon (15) || 15,250 || 15–29 || L5
|- style="background:#bfb;" 
| 45 || May 21 || Diamondbacks || 7–1 || Márquez (3–4) || Frankoff (0–1) || — || 18,158 || 16–29 || W1
|- style="background:#bfb;" 
| 46 || May 22 || Diamondbacks || 7–6 || Kinley (1–0) || Bumgarner (4–4) || Bard (5) || 20,183 || 17–29 || W2
|- style="background:#bfb;" 
| 47 || May 23 || Diamondbacks || 4–3 || Bard (2–3) || Crichton (0–3) || — || 19,221 || 18–29 || W3
|- style="background:#bfb;" 
| 48 || May 24 || @ Mets || 3–2 || Gomber (3–4) || Peterson (1–4) || Estévez (2) || 8,438 || 19–29 || W4
|- style="background:#fbb;"
| 49 || May 25 || @ Mets || 1–3 || Castro (1–1) || Gonzalez (2–3) || Díaz (8) || 9,190 || 19–30 || L1
|- style="background:#bbb;" 
| — || May 26 || @ Mets ||colspan=7| PPD, RAIN; rescheduled for May 27
|- style="background:#fbb;"
| 50 || May 27  || @ Mets || 0–1  || Stroman (4–4) || Márquez (3–5) || Díaz (9) || N/A || 19–31 || L2
|- style="background:#fbb;" 
| 51 || May 27  || @ Mets || 2–4  || Loup (2–0) || Senzatela (1–5) || Barnes (2) || 9,569 || 19–32 || L3
|- style="background:#bbb;"
| — || May 28 || @ Pirates ||colspan=7| PPD, RAIN; rescheduled for May 29
|- style="background:#fbb;" 
| 52 || May 29  || @ Pirates || 0–7  || Brubaker (4–4) || Gray (4–5) || — || 5,279 || 19–33 || L4
|- style="background:#fbb;" 
| 53 || May 29  || @ Pirates || 0–4  || Keller (3–6) || Gomber (3–5) || — || 7,183 || 19–34 || L5
|- style="background:#bfb;" 
| 54 || May 30 || @ Pirates || 4–3 || Bard (3–3) || Rodríguez (3–1) || — || 7,917 || 20–34 || W1
|-

|- style="background:#bfb;"
| 55 || June 1 || Rangers || 3–2  || Givens (2–2) || Martin (0–2) || — || 18,028 || 21–34 || W2
|- style="background:#bfb;" 
| 56 || June 2 || Rangers || 6–3 || Senzatela (2–5) || Evans (0–1) || Bard (6) || 19,289 || 22–34 || W3
|- style="background:#bfb;" 
| 57 || June 3 || Rangers || 11–6 || Gomber (4–5) || Foltynewicz (1–6) || — || 19,150 || 23–34 || W4
|- style="background:#fbb;" 
| 58 || June 4 || Athletics || 5–9 || Montas (6–5) || Gray (4–6) || — || 26,790 || 23–35 || L1
|- style="background:#fbb;" 
| 59 || June 5 || Athletics || 3–6 || Irvin (4–7) || Freeland (0–1) || Trivino (8) || 27,459 || 23–36 || L1
|- style="background:#bfb;" 
| 60 || June 6 || Athletics || 3–1 || Márquez (4–5) || Kaprielian (2–1) || Bard (7) || 23,716 || 24–36 || W1
|- style="background:#fbb;" 
| 61 || June 8 || @ Marlins || 2–6 || López (2–3) || Senzatela (2–6) || — || 4,863 || 24–37 || L1
|- style="background:#bfb;" 
| 62 || June 9 || @ Marlins || 4–3 || Gomber (5–5) || Garrett (0–1) || Bard (8) || 4,563 || 25–37 || W1
|- style="background:#fbb;" 
| 63 || June 10 || @ Marlins || 4–11 || Rogers (7–3) || Gonzalez (2–4) || — || 4,965 || 25–38 || L1
|- style="background:#fbb;" 
| 64 || June 11 || @ Reds || 5–11 || Mahle (6–2) || Freeland (0–2) || — || 20,505 || 25–39 || L2
|- style="background:#fbb;" 
| 65 || June 12 || @ Reds || 3–10 || Miley (6–4) || Márquez (4–6) || — || 23,765 || 25–40 || L3
|- style="background:#fbb;" 
| 66 || June 13 || @ Reds || 2–6 || Hendrix (3–1) || Senzatela (2–7) || — || 18,268 || 25–41 || L4
|- style="background:#bfb;"
| 67 || June 14 || Padres || 3–2 || Gomber (6–5) || Lamet (1–2) || Bard (9) || 23,027 || 26–41 || W1
|- style="background:#bfb;" 
| 68 || June 15 || Padres || 8–4 || Estévez (1–0) || Hill (3–3) || — || 22,871 || 27–41 || W2
|- style="background:#bfb;" 
| 69 || June 16 || Padres || 8–7 || Estévez (2–0) || Adams (2–1) || — || 18,798 || 28–41 || W3
|- style="background:#bfb;" 
| 70 || June 17 || Brewers || 7–3 || Márquez (5–6) || Woodruff (5–3) || — || 22,756 || 29–41 || W4
|- style="background:#bfb;" 
| 71 || June 18 || Brewers || 6–5  || Chacín (1–1) || Williams (2–1) || — || 27,117 || 30–41 || W5
|- style="background:#fbb;" 
| 72 || June 19 || Brewers || 5–6 || Richards (2–0) || Kinley (1–1) || Hader (18) || 34,198 || 30–42 || L1
|- style="background:#fbb;" 
| 73 || June 20 || Brewers || 6–7 || Williams (3–1) || Bard (3–4) || Boxberger (3) || 34,224 || 30–43 || L2
|- style="background:#fbb;" 
| 74 || June 22 || @ Mariners || 1–2 || Sewald (4–2) || Kinley (1–2) || Graveman (6) || 12,879 || 30–44 || L3
|- style="background:#bfb;" 
| 75 || June 23 || @ Mariners || 5–2 || Márquez (6–6) || Sheffield (5–7) || Bard (10) || 11,141 || 31–44 || W1
|- style="background:#fbb;" 
| 76 || June 25 || @ Brewers || 4–5  || Williams (4–1) || Gilbreath (0–1) || — || 31,140 || 31–45 || L1
|- style="background:#fbb;" 
| 77 || June 26 || @ Brewers || 4–10 || Boxberger (3–2) || Estévez (2–1) || — || 32,573 || 31–46 || L2
|- style="background:#fbb;" 
| 78 || June 27 || @ Brewers || 0–5 || Lauer (2–3) || Gonzalez (2–5) || — || 25,016 || 31–47 || L3
|- style="background:#bfb;" 
| 79 || June 28 || Pirates || 2–0 || Freeland (1–2) || Anderson (3–8) || Bard (11) || 32,092 || 32–47 || W1
|- style="background:#bfb;" 
| 80 || June 29 || Pirates || 8–0 || Márquez (7–6) || De Jong (0–3) || — || 27,915 || 33–47 || W2
|- style="background:#bfb;" 
| 81 || June 30 || Pirates || 6–2 || Gray (5–6) || Kuhl (2–5) || — || 20,270 || 34–47 || W3
|-

|- style="background:#bfb;" 
| 82 || July 1 || Cardinals || 5–2 || Bard (4–4) || Gallegos (5–2) || — || 30,410 || 35–47 || W4
|- style="background:#fbb;" 
| 83 || July 2 || Cardinals || 3–9  || Reyes (5–2) || Almonte (1–2) || — || 47,224 || 35–48 || L1
|- style="background:#bfb;"
| 84 || July 3 || Cardinals || 3–2 || Chacín (2–1) || Cabrera (1–3) || Bard (12) || 48,182 || 36–48 || W1
|- style="background:#bfb;" 
| 85 || July 4 || Cardinals || 3–2 || Lawrence (1–0) || Reyes (5–3) || — || 36,891 || 37–48 || W2
|- style="background:#fbb;" 
| 86 || July 6 || @ Diamondbacks || 3–4 || Soria (1–3) || Bard (4–5) || — || 6,847 || 37–49 || L1
|- style="background:#fbb;" 
| 87 || July 7 || @ Diamondbacks || 4–6 || Peacock (3–6) || Senzatela (2–8) || Soria (2) || 7,852 || 37–50 || L2
|- style="background:#bfb;" 
| 88 || July 8 || @ Diamondbacks || 9–3 || Gonzalez (3–5) || Weems (0–1) || — || 7,740 || 38–50 || W1
|- style="background:#fbb;" 
| 89 || July 9 || @ Padres || 2–4 || Díaz (3–1) || Freeland (1–3) || Melancon (27) || 34,953 || 38–51 || L1
|- style="background:#bfb;" 
| 90 || July 10 || @ Padres || 3–0 || Márquez (8–6) || Musgrove (5–7) || Bard (13) || 42,351 || 39–51 || W1
|- style="background:#bfb;" 
| 91 || July 11 || @ Padres || 3–1 || Gray (6–6) || Stammen (3–2) || Bard (14) || 38,235 || 40–51 || W2
|-style="text-align:center; background:#bbcaff;"
|colspan="10"|91st All-Star Game in Denver, Colorado
|- style="background:#fbb;" 
| 92 || July 16 || Dodgers || 4–10 || Urías (12–3) || Gonzalez (3–6) || — || 44,251 || 40–52 || L1
|- style="background:#fbb;" 
| 93 || July 17 || Dodgers || 2–9 || Buehler (10–1) || Freeland (1–4) || — || 48,245 || 40–53 || L2
|- style="background:#bfb;" 
| 94 || July 18 || Dodgers || 6–5  || Givens (3–2) || Bickford (0–1) || — || 35,513 || 41–53 || W1
|- style="background:#fbb;" 
| 95 || July 20 || Mariners || 4–6 || Gonzales (2–5) || Márquez (8–7) || Graveman (9) || 30,715 || 41–54 || L1
|- style="background:#bfb;" 
| 96 || July 21 || Mariners || 6–3 || Gomber (7–5) || Middleton (0–1) || Bard (15) || 25,053 || 42–54 || W1
|- style="background:#bfb;"
| 97 || July 23 || @ Dodgers || 9–6  || Bard (5–5) || Sherfy (2–1) || Gilbreath (1) || 43,730 || 43–54 || W2
|- style="background:#fbb;" 
| 98 || July 24 || @ Dodgers || 0–1 || Gonsolin (2–1) || Freeland (1–5) || Jansen (22) || 42,245 || 43–55 || L1
|- style="background:#fbb;"
| 99 || July 25 || @ Dodgers || 2–3 || Bickford (1–1) || Estévez (2–2) || Kelly (1) || 42,621 || 43–56 || L2
|- style="background:#fbb;" 
| 100 || July 26 || @ Angels || 2–6 || Ohtani (5–1) || Márquez (8–8) || Iglesias (22) || 22,751 || 43–57 || L3
|- style="background:#bfb;" 
| 101 || July 27 || @ Angels || 12–3 || Gomber (8–5) || Suárez (4–4) || — || 16,115 || 44–57 || W1
|- style="background:#fbb;"
| 102 || July 28 || @ Angels || 7–8 || Iglesias (7–4) || Estévez (2–3) || — || 16,365 || 44–58 || L1
|- style="background:#fbb;" 
| 103 || July 29 || @ Padres || 0–3 || Musgrove (7–7) || Freeland (1–6) || Melancon (32) || 31,884 || 44–59 || L2
|- style="background:#bfb;" 
| 104 || July 30 || @ Padres || 9–4 || Gray (7–6) || Weathers (4–3) || — || 38,686 || 45–59 || W1
|- style="background:#bfb;" 
| 105 || July 31 || @ Padres || 5–3 || Márquez (9–8) || Darvish (7–6) || Bard (16) || 44,144 || 46–59 || W2
|-

|- style="background:#fbb;" 
| 106 || August 1 || @ Padres || 1–8 || Stammen (5–2) || Gomber (8–6) || — || 36,247 || 46–60 || L1
|- style="background:#bfb;" 
| 107 || August 3 || Cubs || 13–6 || Freeland (2–6) || Davies (6–8) || — || 38,188 || 47–60 || W1
|- style="background:#fbb;" 
| 108 || August 4 || Cubs || 2–3 || Mills (5–4) || Gray (7–7) || Rodríguez (1) || 36,205 || 47–61 || L1
|- style="background:#bfb;" 
| 109 || August 5 || Cubs || 6–5 || Kinley (2–2) || Jewell (0–1) || Bard (17) || 30,462 || 48–61 || W1
|- style="background:#bfb;" 
| 110 || August 6 || Marlins || 14–2 || Márquez (10–8) || Alcántara (6–10) || — || 28,281 || 49–61 || W2
|- style="background:#bfb;" 
| 111 || August 7 || Marlins || 7–4 || Gomber (9–6) || Luzardo (3–5) || Bard (18) || 39,986 || 50–61 || W3
|- style="background:#bfb;" 
| 112 || August 8 || Marlins || 13–8 || Freeland (3–6) || Hess (2–2) || — || 34,677 || 51–61 || W4
|- style="background:#fbb;"
| 113 || August 10 || @ Astros || 0–5 || Odorizzi (5–6) || Gray (7–8) || — || 28,931 || 51–62 || L1
|- style="background:#fbb;" 
| 114 || August 11 || @ Astros || 1–5 || Valdez (8–3) || Senzatela (2–9) || — || 22,200 || 51–63 || L2
|- style="background:#fbb;" 
| 115 || August 12 || @ Giants || 0–7 || Webb (6–3) || Márquez (10–9) || — || 24,295 || 51–64 || L3
|- style="background:#fbb;"
| 116 || August 13 || @ Giants || 4–5 || DeSclafani (11–5) || Gomber (9–7) || Littell (2) || 36,126 || 51–65 || L4
|- style="background:#bfb;" 
| 117 || August 14 || @ Giants || 4–1 || Freeland (4–6) || Leone (2–2) || Bard (19) || 32,282 || 52–65 || W1
|- style="background:#fbb;" 
| 118 || August 15 || @ Giants || 2–5 || Wood (10–3) || Gray (7–9) || McGee (25) || 33,337 || 52–66 || L1
|- style="background:#bfb;" 
| 119 || August 16 || Padres || 6–5 || Bard (6–5) || Hudson (4–2) || — || 24,565 || 53–66 || W1
|- style="background:#bfb;" 
| 120 || August 17 || Padres || 7–3 || Márquez (11–9) || Strahm (0–1) || — || 28,139 || 54–66 || W2
|- style="background:#bfb;" 
| 121 || August 18 || Padres || 7–5 || Bowden (2–2) || Arrieta (5–12) || Bard (20) || 20,692 || 55–66 || W3
|- style="background:#bfb;" 
| 122 || August 20 || Diamondbacks || 9–4 || Stephenson (1–1) || de Geus (2–2) || — || 30,243 || 56–66 || W4
|- style="background:#bfb;" 
| 123 || August 21 || Diamondbacks || 5–2 || Bard (7–5) || Wendelken (2–2) || — || 32,699 || 57–66 || W5
|- style="background:#fbb;" 
| 124 || August 22 || Diamondbacks || 4–8 || Widener (2–1) || Gray (7–10) || — || 24,552 || 57–67 || L1
|- style="background:#fbb;"
| 125 || August 23 || @ Cubs || 4–6 || Rodríguez (2–2) || Bard (7–6) || — || 25,577 || 57–68 || L2
|- style="background:#bbb;" 
| — || August 24 || @ Cubs || colspan=7 | Postponed (Rain, Makeup August 25)
|- style="background:#fbb;"
| 126 || August 25  || @ Cubs || 2–5  || Heuer (5–2) || Gomber (9–8) || Morgan (1) || 24,161 || 57–69 || L3
|- style="background:#bfb;" 
| 127 || August 25  || @ Cubs || 13–10  || Bowden (3–2) || Jewell (0–2) || — || 24,936 || 58–69 || W1
|- style="background:#bfb;"
| 128 || August 27 || @ Dodgers || 4–2 || Freeland (5–6) || Jackson (0–1) || Estévez (3) || 40,100 || 59–69 || W2
|- style="background:#fbb;" 
| 129 || August 28 || @ Dodgers || 2–5 || Treinen (4–5) || Bard (7–7) || Jansen (29) || 42,479 || 59–70 || L1
|- style="background:#bfb;" 
| 130 || August 29 || @ Dodgers || 5–0 || Senzatela (3–9) || White (1–2) || — || 37,569 || 60–70 || W1
|- style="background:#fbb;" 
| 131 || August 30 || @ Rangers || 3–4 || Alexy (1–0) || Márquez (11–10) || Barlow (3) || 14,990 || 60–71 || L1
|- style="background:#fbb;" 
| 132 || August 31 || @ Rangers || 3–4 || Lyles (7–11) || Gomber (9–9) || Patton (2) || 18,383 || 60–72 || L2
|-

|- style="background:#bfb;" 
| 133 || September 1 || @ Rangers || 9–5 || Chacín (3–1) || Barlow (0–2) || — || 14,747 || 61–72 || W1
|- style="background:#fbb;" 
| 134 || September 2 || Braves || 5–6 || Webb (2–2) || Almonte (1–3) || Smith (30) || 21,481 || 61–73 || L1
|- style="background:#bfb;" 
| 135 || September 3 || Braves || 4–3 || Senzatela (4–9) || Ynoa (4–5) || Estévez (4) || 24,371 || 62–73 || W1
|- style="background:#bfb;" 
| 136 || September 4 || Braves || 7–6 || Kinley (3–2) || Minter (2–5) || Estévez (5) || 35,351 || 63–73 || W2
|- style="background:#fbb;" 
| 137 || September 5 || Braves || 2–9 || Morton (13–5) || Feltner (0–1) || — || 33,957 || 63–74 || L1
|- style="background:#fbb;" 
| 138 || September 6 || Giants || 5–10 || Gausman (13–5) || Freeland (5–7) || — || 27,967 || 63–75 || L2
|- style="background:#fbb;" 
| 139 || September 7 || Giants || 3–12 || Webb (9–3) || Gonzalez (3–7) || — || 24,387 || 63–76 || L3
|- style="background:#fbb;" 
| 140 || September 8 || Giants || 4–7 || Rogers (6–1) || Estévez (2–4) || McGee (30) || 20,358 || 63–77 || L4
|- style="background:#bfb;" 
| 141 || September 9 || @ Phillies || 4–3 || Gilbreath (1–1) || Kennedy (1–1) || Estévez (6) || 18,071 || 64–77 || W1
|- style="background:#bfb;" 
| 142 || September 10 || @ Phillies || 11–2 || Márquez (12–10) || Falter (2–1) || — || 22,138 || 65–77 || W2
|- style="background:#fbb;" 
| 143 || September 11 || @ Phillies || 1–6 || Wheeler (13–9) || Freeland (5–8) || — || 23,232 || 65–78 || L1
|- style="background:#bfb;" 
| 144 || September 12 || @ Phillies || 5–4 || Goudeau (1–0) || Neris (2–6) || Estévez (7) || 24,099 || 66–78 || W1
|- style="background:#bfb;" 
| 145 || September 14 || @ Braves || 5–4 || Gray (8–10) || Toussaint (3–3) || Estévez (8) || 22,579 || 67–78 || W2
|- style="background:#bfb;" 
| 146 || September 15 || @ Braves || 3–2  || Estévez (3–4) || Minter (2–6) || Stephenson (1) || 21,382 || 68–78 || W3
|- style="background:#bbb;"
| — || September 16 || @ Braves || colspan=7 | Cancelled (Rain)
|- style="background:#bfb;" 
| 147 || September 17 || @ Nationals || 9–8 || Gilbreath (2–1) || Finnegan (5–8) || Estévez (9) || 21,195 || 69–78 || W4
|- style="background:#bfb;" 
| 148 || September 18 || @ Nationals || 6–0 || Freeland (6–8) || Corbin (8–15) || — || 29,315 || 70–78 || W5
|- style="background:#fbb;" 
| 149 || September 19 || @ Nationals || 0–3 || Espino (5–5) || Gray (8–11) || Finnegan (10) || 26,303 || 70–79 || L1
|- style="background:#fbb;" 
| 150 || September 21 || Dodgers || 4–5  || Jansen (3–4) || Chacín (3–2) || Vesia (1) || 23,869 || 70–80 || L2
|- style="background:#bfb;" 
| 151 || September 22 || Dodgers || 10–5 || Stephenson (2–1) || Bruihl (0–1) || — || 27,013 || 71–80 || W1
|- style="background:#fbb;" 
| 152 || September 23 || Dodgers || 5–7  || Jansen (4–4) || Gilbreath (2–2) || Treinen (6) || 22,356 || 71–81 || L1
|- style="background:#fbb;" 
| 153 || September 24 || Giants || 2–7 || Castro (1–0) || Goudeau (1–1) || — || 41,613 || 71–82 || L2
|- style="background:#fbb;"
| 154 || September 25 || Giants || 2–7 || Watson (7–4) || Gray (8–12) || — || 45,063 || 71–83 || L3
|- style="background:#fbb;" 
| 155 || September 26 || Giants || 2–6 || Doval (5–1) || Bard (7–8) || — || 31,043 || 71–84 || L4
|- style="background:#fbb;" 
| 156 || September 27 || Nationals || 4–5 || Gray (2–2) || Márquez (12–11) || Rainey (3) || 20,388 || 71–85 || L5
|- style="background:#bfb;" 
| 157 || September 28 || Nationals || 3–1 || Freeland (7–8) || Corbin (9–16) || Estévez (10) || 21,693 || 72–85 || W1
|- style="background:#bfb;" 
| 158 || September 29 || Nationals || 10–5 || Goudeau (2–1) || Thompson (1–3) || — || 20,613 || 73–85 || W2
|-

|- style="background:#bfb;" 
| 159 || October 1 || @ Diamondbacks || 9–7 || Gilbreath (3–2) || Wendelken (3–3) || Estévez (11) || 15,189 || 74–85 || W3
|- style="background:#fbb;"
| 160 || October 2 || @ Diamondbacks || 2–11 || Gallen (4–10) || Senzatela (4–10) || — || 19,418 || 74–86 || L1
|- style="background:#fbb;" 
| 161 || October 3 || @ Diamondbacks || 4–5 || Wendelken (4–3) || Estévez (3–5) || — || 12,565 || 74–87 || L2
|-

|- style="text-align:center;"
| Legend:       = Win       = Loss       = PostponementBold = Rockies team member

Roster

Statistics

Batting
List does not include pitchers. Stats in bold are the team leaders.

Note: G = Games played; AB = At bats; R = Runs; H = Hits; 2B = Doubles; 3B = Triples; HR = Home runs; RBI = Runs batted in; BB = Walks; SO = Strikeouts; AVG = Batting average; OBP = On-base percentage; SLG = Slugging percentage; OPS = On-base percentage + slugging

Pitching
List does not include position players. Stats in bold are the team leaders.

Note: W = Wins; L = Losses; ERA = Earned run average; G = Games pitched; GS = Games started; SV = Saves; IP = Innings pitched; H = Hits allowed; R = Runs allowed; ER = Earned runs allowed; BB = Walks allowed; K = Strikeouts

Farm system

Source:

References

External links
2021 Colorado Rockies schedule at MLB.com
2021 Colorado Rockies season at Baseball Reference

Colorado Rockies seasons
Colorado Rockies
Colorado Rockies
2020s in Denver